José Eusebio Barros Baeza (1810–1881) was a Chilean lawyer and politician. He was born in Santiago in 1810. He died in the same city in 1881. He was the son of Don Antonio and Dona Barros Grez Deidamia Baeza de la Fuente.

Education
José Eusebio Barros Baeza studied at the Instituto Nacional (the National Institute), where he graduated as a lawyer in 1842. He first worked in the Municipality of Santiago, then went to the Ministry of Justice, Culture and Education, as Secretary (1846).

Political life
A follower of Manuel Montt, Baeza first campaigned for the Conservatives then later moved over to the National Party, of which he was elected deputy by Bulnes (1855-1858) and by Itata (1858-1861). During these periods he integrated the Standing Committee on Education and Welfare.

He was secretary of the Chamber of Deputies (1855-1856). He was later a member of the Chilean Legation in Rio de Janeiro (1863) and Guatemala (1868). He became Minister of the Court of Appeals of Santiago in 1870.

References 

1810 births
1881 deaths
People from Santiago
Chilean people of Galician descent
National Party (Chile, 1857) politicians
Members of the Chamber of Deputies of Chile
Instituto Nacional General José Miguel Carrera alumni
19th-century Chilean lawyers